Maja Einstein (born Maria Einstein, married name Maja Winteler-Einstein) (18 November 1881 - 25 June 1951) was a German Romanist and the younger sister of the physicist Albert Einstein.

Early life and education 
Einstein was born in Munich. Her mother was Pauline Einstein (née Koch) and her father was Hermann Einstein. Maja Einstein attended elementary school in Munich. Through mismanagement the family got into financial difficulties and moved to Italy. In Milan she attended the German-speaking International School from 1887 to 1894. In 1899 she moved to Aarau, where her brother Albert attended the Kantonsschule and joined the family of the school professor Jost Winteler. There she met his youngest son Paul Winteler, her future husband. In Aarau she was a student of the teacher's seminar from 1899 to 1902. After the death of her father she acquired the teacher's patent in 1905.

Einstein studied Romance languages and literature in Berlin, Bern, and Paris. She received her doctorate from the University of Bern in 1909 with the dissertation Feststellung des Handschriftenverhältnises des Chevalier au Cygne und Enfances Godefroy. On 23 March 1910 she married Paul Winteler and lost her work permit as a result.

Life 
Einstein and her husband moved to Lucerne-Bramberg. After the death of Maja Einstein's mother in 1920, they moved to Italy and acquired an estate outside Florence in Colonnata (Sesto Fiorentino). In 1924, her brother Albert gave them 7,000 Reichsmarks to pay off debts that burdened the estate. Their financial problems continued due to unemployment.
 

Following the introduction of anti-Semitic laws by Benito Mussolini in Italy, Maja Einstein relocated to the United States in February 1939. She moved to Princeton to live with her brother Albert on Mercer Street. Her husband Paul was denied entry to enter the U.S. for health reasons, and he stayed with relatives in Geneva. Maja Einstein intended to return home after the end of the Second World War. In 1946 she suffered a stroke. She later developed arteriosclerosis and became bedridden, which prevented her from returning to Europe. Einstein maintained a correspondence with Paul until her death. She died on 25 June 1951 of pneumonia as a result of a fracture of the upper arm in Princeton. Her husband died on 15 July 1952 in Geneva.

References

Further reading 
 Franziska Rogger: Einsteins Schwester. Maja Einstein – ihr Leben und ihr Bruder Albert. Verlag Neue Zürcher Zeitung, Zürich 2005, .
 Christof Rieber: Albert Einstein. Biografie eines Nonkonformisten. Thorbecke-Verlag, Ostfildern 2018, .

1881 births
1951 deaths
Einstein family
Jewish women
People from Princeton, New Jersey
University of Bern alumni
German expatriates in Italy
German expatriates in the United States